Just Sangeetha is a musical TV show in Kannada, telecast on Kasthuri TV. It is a first of its kind show format in the South India.

The show features various well-known bands and artists from across Karnataka and also talented upcoming artists. The show is a confluence of culture, styles and genres of music wherein artists perform the version songs and also the covers. Various music genres like Hinduatani Classical, Jazz, Carnatic, Reggie, Ghazal, Janapada Geete, Shastriya Sangeeta, Qawwali, rock, Indi-pop, Thumri, Sufi, Hip-hop, folk, devotional and more all blended into one color called Just Sangeetha.

Featured artists
 Raghu Dixit
 Faiyaz Khan (Sarangi Player)
 Archana Udupa
 Hum-Drum (M. D. Pallavi Arun, Keith Peters, Sumith Ramachandran, Arun Kumar)
 Praveen D Rao
 Swarathma

References

External links
Youtube.com

Indian television series